Hallo – Hotel Sacher … Portier! is an Austrian television series.

See also 
 List of Austrian television series

External links 
 

Austrian television series
1973 Austrian television series debuts
1974 Austrian television series endings
1970s Austrian television series
German-language television shows